John Guillebaud is Emeritus Professor of Family Planning and Reproductive Health at University College London. He was born in Burundi and brought up in Rwanda, Uganda, Kenya, and Britain. 
He qualified as a medical doctor from University of Cambridge in 1964.

He is a patron of Population Matters (formerly the Optimum Population Trust) and initiated the environment time capsule project.

Selected publications
“Voluntary family planning to minimise and mitigate climate change”. British Medical Journal 2016;353:i2102 |

References

External links
 Sex - The Most Dangerous Human Activity? Part I
 Sex - The Most Dangerous Human Activity? Part II
 Sex - The Most Dangerous Human Activity? Part III

Living people
20th-century British medical doctors
Year of birth missing (living people)
Academics of University College London
Alumni of the University of Cambridge